Harold Good (born 1937 in Derry) is an Irish Methodist who in 2005 played a vital role in the Northern Ireland peace process.

He trained as a hospital chaplain at Methodist Hospital of Indianapolis in 1967–68. He served as a minister in Shankhill, Belfast and also at the City's Crumlin Road prison. From 1973 to 1979 he was director of the Corrymeela Community Centre for Reconciliation. In 2001 he was appointed president of the Methodist Church in Ireland. In 2005 he was one of two independent witnesses, the other being Alec Reid, who oversaw the decommissioning of arms, a vital part of the peace process. In 2007 he was awarded the World Methodist Peace Award.

References

1937 births
Living people
Clergy from Derry (city)
Irish Methodist ministers
Presidents of the Methodist Church in Ireland
Gandhi International Peace Award recipients